The 2019–20 season was Doncaster Rovers' 141st season in their existence, 17th consecutive season in the Football League and third consecutive season in League One. Along with League One, the club also participated in the FA Cup, EFL Cup and EFL Trophy. The season covered the period from 1 July 2019 to 30 June 2020.

Squad

Detailed overview 
Players with previous first team games or current professional contracts with Doncaster before the start of the season, including those coming in from the Academy.
League caps and goals up to the start of season 2019–20.
Players with name and squad number struck through and marked  left the club during the playing season.

Statistics 
This includes any players featured in a match day squad in any competition.

|-
! colspan=16 style=background:#dcdcdc; text-align:center| Players who left during the season

|}

Goals record
.

Disciplinary record
.

Transfers

Transfers in

Loans in

Loans out

Transfers out

Pre-season
Donny announced pre-season friendlies against Rossington Main, Gainsborough Trinity, FC Halifax Town, Grimsby Town and Hull City.

Competitions

Overview

{| class="wikitable" style="text-align: center"
|-
!rowspan=2|Competition
!colspan=8|Record
|-
!
!
!
!
!
!
!
!
|-
| League One

|-
| FA Cup

|-
| League Cup

|-
| EFL Trophy

|-
! Total

League One

League table

Results summary

Results by matchday

Matches
On Thursday, 20 June 2019, the EFL League One fixtures were revealed.

August

September

October

November

December

January

February

March

April

May

FA Cup

The first round draw was made on 21 October 2019. The second round draw was made live on 11 November from Chichester City's stadium, Oaklands Park.

EFL Cup

The first round draw was made on 20 June.

EFL Trophy

On 9 July 2019, the pre-determined group stage draw was announced with Invited clubs to be drawn on 12 July 2019. The draw for the second round was made on 16 November 2019 live on Sky Sports.

Awards

Sky Bet League One Player of the Month

Sky Bet League One Goal of the Month

Sky Bet League One Manager of the Month

Club Awards

Player of the month
Awarded monthly to the player that was voted by the Official Supporters Club.

Goal of the month
Awarded monthly to the player that was chosen by fans voting on doncasterroversfc.co.uk.

References

Doncaster Rovers F.C. seasons
Doncaster Rovers